Zelenikovo is a village in the municipality of Zelenikovo, North Macedonia.

Demographics
As of the 2021 census, Zelenikovo had 1,107 residents with the following ethnic composition:
Macedonians 977
Persons for whom data are taken from administrative sources 82
Roma 29
Serbs 15
Others 4

According to the 2002 census, the village had a total of 771 inhabitants. Ethnic groups in the village include:
Macedonians 697
Serbs 8
Romani 61
Aromanians 1
Others 4

References

Villages in Zelenikovo Municipality